Hibbertia cactifolia is a species of flowering plant in the family Dilleniaceae and is endemic to the Arnhem Land escarpment. It is a multi-stemmed shrublet with hairy foliage, oblong to elliptic leaves and yellow flowers arranged singly in leaf axils, with twenty-six to twenty-eight stamens arranged in groups around the two carpels.

Description
There are twenty-six to twenty-eight stamens arranged in groups around the two carpels, each carpel with two ovules. Flowering occurs from December to June.

Taxonomy
Hibbertia cactifolia was first formally described in 2010 by Hellmut R. Toelken in the Journal of the Adelaide Botanic Gardens from specimens collected by Lyndley Craven in Katherine Gorge in 1981. The specific epithet (cactifolia) means "cactus-leaved", referring to the hairs on the leaves, appearing like cactus leaves under the microscope.

Distribution and habitat
This hibbertia grows in sandy soil in open forest in the south-western part of the Arnhem Land escarpment in the Northern Territory.

Conservation status
Goodenia cactifolia is classified as of "least concern" under the Northern Territory Government Territory Parks and Wildlife Conservation Act 1976.

See also
List of Hibbertia species

References

cactifolia
Flora of the Northern Territory
Plants described in 2010
Taxa named by Hellmut R. Toelken